HSCI may refer to:

Human Stem Cells Institute, a Biotech research company in Russia
Honda Siel Cars India, a joint car-manufacturing venture in India